Jimmy Dimos (born 1938) was an American judge and politician in Louisiana. He immigrated from SR Macedonia, SFR Yugoslavia (modern-day North Macedonia) as a child in 1951, joining his father in the U.S. He was a member of the Eastern Orthodox Church growing up. He graduated from Neville High School in Monroe, Louisiana. He attended the University of Louisiana at Monroe and Tulane University.

Dimos served in the Louisiana House of Representatives from 1976 to 1999. He represented Ouachita Parish. During the governorship of Buddy Roemer, Dimos was speaker of the house. In 2017, Dimos was inducted into the Louisiana Political Museum and Hall of Fame and the Louisiana Justice Hall of Fame.

References

Living people
Speakers of the Louisiana House of Representatives
University of Louisiana at Monroe alumni
Tulane University alumni
20th-century American politicians
Macedonian emigrants to the United States
1938 births